David A. Whitaker (born 21 February 1988) is a British playwright, actor and theatre director. Currently attending Rose Bruford College, Whitaker is one of the country's youngest playwrights, having seen his work performed in both England and America. His proportionally small career has seen him act in over 25 productions, direct 8 plays and devised pieces, and appear in several short films and commercials. Best known for his work with writing partner Callum Patrick Hughes, their play Coffee and John was produced in Texas in February 2010, two days before his 22nd birthday. He is currently finishing his degree at Rose Bruford, whilst currently working on his 3rd collaboration with Hughes. Their second play, Ourselves Alone, will be premièred in 2011. He lives in Kent with his writing partner Callum Patrick Hughes and Hughes's girlfriend.

Plays
 Retrospect (2004)
 The Fame Effect (2005)
 Coffee and John (2008)
 A Definition of Love (2008)
 Ourselves Alone (2009)
 Sexed Up (2010)
 A Life in Monochrome (2010)

References

External links 
 
 

1988 births
Living people
British dramatists and playwrights
British male dramatists and playwrights